Eupithecia yasudai is a moth in the family Geometridae. It is found in Nepal.

References

Moths described in 1987
yasudai
Moths of Asia